Molly Smith (born March 12, 1981) is an American film producer. Smith is the daughter of FedEx founder Frederick W. Smith and the sister to Windland Smith Rice, a photographer, and Arthur Smith, the current head coach of the Atlanta Falcons. She runs her company, Black Label Media, with partners Trent and Thad Luckinbill.

Filmography
 P.S. I Love You, (2007)
 The Blind Side, (2009, executive)
 Something Borrowed, (2011)
 Choose You, (2011, executive)
 Beautiful Creatures, (2013)
 Begin Again, (2013, executive)
 The Good Lie, (2014)
 You're Not You, (2014)
 Breaking a Monster, (2015)
 Sicario, (2015)
 Demolition, (2015)
 La La Land, (2016, executive)
 Love and the Line, (2016, short, executive)
 Rebel in the Rye, (2017)
 Only the Brave, (2017)
 12 Strong, (2018)
 Sicario: Day of the Soldado, (2018)
 Sierra Burgess Is a Loser, (2018)
 Broken Diamonds, (2021)
 Devotion, (2022)
 Whitney Houston: I Wanna Dance with Somebody, (2022)

References

American film producers
Living people
People from Memphis, Tennessee
1981 births